The Music Bank Chart is a record chart on the South Korean KBS television music program Music Bank. Every week, the show awards the best-performing single on the chart in the country during its live broadcast.

In 2013, 36 singles achieved a number one on the chart and 30 music acts were awarded first-place trophies. Of all releases for the year f(x)'s "Rum Pum Pum Pum" acquired the highest point total on the August 9 broadcast with a score of 16,888.

Chart history

References 

2013 in South Korean music
2013 record charts
Lists of number-one songs in South Korea